Mombello is the name of a number of places in Italy:
Mombello di Torino, in the Province of Turin
Mombello Monferrato, in the Province of Alessandria
Laveno-Mombello, in the Province of Varese